Oil Empire is a 1996 managerial/simulation strategy game developed by 88th Panzer Division and published by ABA Denver company.

References 

1996 video games
Simulation video games